German submarine U-588 was a Type VIIC U-boat of Nazi Germany's Kriegsmarine during World War II.

The boat was sunk by depth charges dropped by Canadian warships, east northeast of St.Johns on 31 July 1942.

Design
German Type VIIC submarines were preceded by the shorter Type VIIB submarines. U-588 had a displacement of  when at the surface and  while submerged. She had two shafts and two  propellers.

U-588 was fitted with five  torpedo tubes (four fitted at the bow and one at the stern), fourteen torpedoes, one  SK C/35 naval gun, 220 rounds, and a  C/30 anti-aircraft gun. The boat had a complement of between forty-four and sixty.

Service history
The submarine was laid down on 31 October 1940 at Blohm & Voss, Hamburg as yard number 564, launched on 23 July 1941 and commissioned on 18 September under the command of Kapitänleutnant Viktor Vogel.

She served with the 6th U-boat Flotilla from 18 September 1941 for training and stayed with that organization for operations until her loss, from 1 January until 31 July 1942.

First patrol
U-588s first patrol began when she left Kiel on 8 January 1942 and headed for the Atlantic Ocean via the gap separating the Faroe and Shetland Islands. There was some confusion over the ships' fate; she was reported missing on the seventh, considered lost on the 14th, but it was not known if her loss was due to the weather or enemy action.

The U-boat arrived at Lorient in occupied France, on 30 January.

Second patrol

The ship was loaded with 80,000 barrels of 'Bunker C' oil. She broke in two on the impact of the torpedo, but the resulting fire was quickly extinguished by the high seas.

Third patrol

A steady stream of successes followed; i.e. Skottland on 17 May, Plow City on the 22nd and Margot on the 23rd. As far as Plow City was concerned, one survivor was taken aboard the U-boat for questioning but returned with cigarettes and rum. The German submariners also helped to right one of the ship's lifeboats. U-588 also damaged Fort Binger on 18 May 1942.

Fourth patrol and loss

Forty-nine men died with U-588; there were no survivors.

Wolfpacks
U-588 took part in two wolfpacks, namely:
 Robbe (15 – 24 January 1942) 
 Pirat (29 – 31 July 1942)

Summary of raiding history

References

Bibliography

External links

German Type VIIC submarines
U-boats commissioned in 1941
U-boats sunk in 1942
U-boats sunk by depth charges
U-boats sunk by Canadian warships
1941 ships
Ships built in Hamburg
World War II shipwrecks in the Atlantic Ocean
Ships lost with all hands
World War II submarines of Germany
Maritime incidents in July 1942